Vilakkuvettom is a village situated near Punalur in Kollam District, Kerala state, India. This beautiful village is has Kallada river flowing through it. St. Mary's Catholic Church Neithumukku Vilakkuvettom Punalur Diocese is located at this place.

Politics
Vilakkuvettom is a part of Punalur assembly constituency in Kollam (Lok Sabha constituency). INC, CPM, CPI, BJP etc. are the major political parties.

Demographics
Malayalam is the native language of Vilakkuvettom.

References

Geography of Kollam district